Otniel Schneller (born 28 January 1952) is an Israeli politician who served as a member of the Knesset for Kadima between 2006 and 2013.

Biography
Born in Jerusalem, and raised in Michigan, Schneller took Jewish studies and social science at Bar-Ilan University, finishing his studies in 1978. Between 1983 and 1986 he served as secretary general of the Yesha Council, the body representing Israeli settlers in Gaza and the West Bank. In 1986 he became director general of the National Safety Authority in the Ministry of Transportation, a role he held until 1996.  Schneller has attended rallies organized by Im Tirtzu, an Israeli far-right group.
 
In the run-up to the 2006 elections he was placed twenty-sixth on Kadima's list. With the party winning 29 seats, he entered the Knesset, and was appointed Deputy Speaker of the Knesset. Placed twenty-seventh on the party's list, he retained his seat in the 2009 elections. He lost his seat in the 2013 elections.

Schneller lives in the settlement of Ma'ale Mikhmas in the West Bank.

Bibliography
Paper Bridge (2005)

References

External links

1952 births
Living people
Bar-Ilan University alumni
Deputy Speakers of the Knesset
Kadima politicians
Members of the 17th Knesset (2006–2009)
Members of the 18th Knesset (2009–2013)
People from Jerusalem